Kimberly Ezekwem (born 19 June 2001) is a German professional footballer who plays as a centre-back for Bundesliga club SC Freiburg.

He is of Nigerian descent.

Career statistics

References

2001 births
Living people
Footballers from Munich
German sportspeople of Nigerian descent
German footballers
Association football defenders
Regionalliga players
3. Liga players
FC Bayern Munich footballers
SC Freiburg players
SC Freiburg II players